Ada ( – 1234/37) was Countess regnant of Holland between 1203 and 1207, ruling jointly with her husband, Louis II of Loon. She was deposed and exiled by her paternal uncle, William I.

Family 
Ada was the only surviving daughter of Count Dirk VII of Holland and his wife Adelaide of Cleves. 

She succeeded her father but immediately had to deal with her uncle William, who claimed Holland for his own. Ada married Count Louis II of Loon to strengthen her position. She was in such a hurry, that she married even before her father was buried, which caused a scandal. These events led to the outbreak of the Loon War (1203–1206).

Succession struggle 

Ada was quickly captured by the supporters of William and taken prisoner in the citadel of Leiden. She was first imprisoned on the island of Texel and afterwards she was taken to John Lackland in the Kingdom of England. William had to accept Louis and Ada as count and countess at a treaty of Bruges in 1206. 

Louis managed to free Ada in 1206, and the couple returned to Loon in 1207. Their reign was short-lived, since Emperor Otto IV regarded William to have more right to the title Count of Holland in 1208.

She did not accept the loss of her county, and Ada and Louis continued the fight. Ada remained childless. Louis died in 1218, leaving Ada to live out the rest of her life in obscurity. She was buried next to her husband in Herkenrode Abbey.

The civil war in Holland became part of a major international war between on one side France and the Hohenstaufen dynasty and on the other side England and the Welfs. William could get Holland through good maneuvering between both sides. Louis and Ada had to give up their claims. Many period histories up to the Protestant Reformation do not include her in the list of rulers of Holland.

References

Further reading 
 Annales Egmundani - Chroniek van Egmond; Oorkonde van Holland en Zeeland. (1482–1484)
 Annales sancti Iacobi Leodiensis, (632–683)
 

1188 births
1230s deaths
Counts of Holland
Dutch expatriates in England
13th-century women rulers
12th-century women of the Holy Roman Empire
13th-century women of the Holy Roman Empire